Pillomena aemula is a species of small air-breathing land snail, a terrestrial pulmonate gastropod mollusc in the family  Charopidae. This species is endemic to Australia.

References

Gastropods of Australia
Pillomena
Gastropods described in 1884
Taxonomy articles created by Polbot